The National League is one of the two baseball leagues constituting Major League Baseball in the United States and Canada.

National League may also refer to:

Politics
Indian National League
Irish National League, founded by Charles Parnell in 1882
National League Party of Ireland, founded by William Redmond and Thomas O'Donnell in 1926
National League (Poland, 1893), a Polish right-wing political organisation
National League (Poland, 2007), a Polish far-right minor political party

Sports

Association football 
Bhutan National League, the premier football competition in Bhutan
Myanmar National League, the premier football league in Myanmar
National League System, a component of the English football league system
National League (English football), a league covering the fifth and sixth tiers of English football
National League (division), the top division of the above league
National League (Turkey), a defunct football league in Turkey
Russian Football National League, the second division of the Russian football system

Cricket
National League (cricket), a cricket league in the United Kingdom

Ice hockey
 National League (ice hockey), the top tier of the Swiss ice hockey league system

Motorcycle speedway
National League (speedway), the third tier of speedway in the United Kingdom which replaced the Conference League in 2009
British League Division Two or National League, the second tier of British speedway
National League (1932–1964), the top speedway league in Britain in the mid-20th century

Netball
National League (netball), the top level of netball in Scotland

Rugby
National Rugby League, the premier rugby league competition in Australia and New Zealand

See also

Kansallinen Liiga, the premier women's football league in Finland
Liga Leumit, the second division of the Israeli football system
National Basketball League (disambiguation)
National Football League (Ireland), Ireland Gaelic football league
National Football League (disambiguation)
National Hurling League, Ireland hurling league
National Ice Hockey League (disambiguation)
National League 1 (third level)
National League 2 North and National League 2 South (fourth level)
National League 3 Midlands, National League 3 North, National League 3 London & SE and National League 3 South-West (fifth level)
National League B, former name of the Swiss League, the second tier of the Swiss ice hockey league system
National League for Democracy, Burmese opposition party founded by Aung San Suu Kyi
National League of the North in Northern Ireland, founded by supporters of Cahir Healy and Joe Devlin in 1928
National Premier Leagues (Australia), the second level of football in Australia
National Women's League (disambiguation)
New Zealand National Soccer League (defunct)
Rugby League Championships in the United Kingdom
Women's National League (disambiguation)